Ronald Drummond Smillie (27 September 1933 – 17 August 2005) was an English footballer who scored 32 goals from 205 appearances in the Football League playing for Barnsley (in two spells) and Lincoln City. He played on the right wing. After leaving Barnsley he moved into the Southern League with Chelmsford City, Margate, Folkestone Town and Dartford.

Smillie's son Neil also played football professionally.

References

1933 births
2005 deaths
People from Grimethorpe
English footballers
Association football wingers
Barnsley F.C. players
Lincoln City F.C. players
Chelmsford City F.C. players
Margate F.C. players
Folkestone F.C. players
Dartford F.C. players
English Football League players
Southern Football League players
Sportspeople from Yorkshire